John Baillie may refer to:

 John Baillie (fl. 1747), author of An Essay on the Sublime
 John Baillie (minister) (1741–1806), English divine, became a minister in 1767
 John Baillie of Leys (1772–1833), officer in the British East India Company, professor and politician
 John Baillie (railway engineer) (1806–1859), born in Newcastle upon Tyne, but worked in Austria and Germany
 John Baillie (theologian) (1886–1960), Scottish theologian and Church of Scotland minister
 John M. Baillie (1847–1913), farmer, school teacher and political figure in Nova Scotia

See also
John Baillie McIntosh (1829–1888), unionist in the American Civil War
John Bailey (disambiguation)
John Bailie, Northern Irish unionist activist
John Bayley (disambiguation)
John Baily (disambiguation)